Kira Skov (born 6 June 1976) is a Danish singer. She is best known for being the lead singer of rock band Kira & The Kindred Spirits.

Early life
Kira was born in the town of Rødovre, and became interested in classical music through her aunt and uncle, both of whom are musicians.

When she was ten years old, her parents divorced, which was difficult for her. About that time she became interested in rock music, and so she tried to learn to play the guitar. This did not go well, however, as she did not have enough patience for it, and so she began singing instead.

Career

Beginnings in Butterfly Species
In 1993 she went to London, where she met a guitarist called Eve, whom she followed to the United States.  Together with Eve and—amongst others—Laust Sonne, she formed a band called Butterfly Species, which existed until 1999.

Kira & The Kindred Spirits
When Butterfly Species split, she left Eve and travelled back home to Denmark.

In 2001, she received a scholarship from Denmark's national arts foundation the Statens Kunstfond, which made it possible for her to concentrate on writing songs, and in 2002 she founded the band Kira & The Kindred Spirits. It was made up of:

Kira Skov - vocals and guitar
Rune Kjeldsen - guitar
Orson Wajih and later replaced by *Nicolai Munch Hansen - bass
Jesper Lind - drums
Nicolaj Torp and later replaced by Jeppe Juul

Over the course of existence of the band from 2001 to 2007, the group became known as a good live band, with Kira as its dynamic powerhouse. They released three albums in the process. In October 2007 it was announced that Kira & The Kindred Spirits had split up and that Kira would pursue a solo career.

Solo
While in the band, Kira became well known for singing a duet with Lars H.U.G. at Rock 'N' Royal in 2004 just before the wedding between Crown Prince Frederik and Crown Princess Mary.

Kira Skov continued with a solo musical career in collaboration with Nicolai Munch Hansen from her former band. In 2014, she released a joint studio album with Marie Fisker entitled The Cabin Project.

Discography

Kira & The Kindred Spirits

Solo as Kira Skov

Kira Skov & Marie Fisker

References

External links
Official website

1976 births
Living people
Danish rock musicians
English-language singers from Denmark
21st-century Danish  women singers